Thomas Möllenkamp (born 7 October 1961) is a retired rower from West Germany. He competed at the 1984 Olympics in the coxless pair and at the 1988 Olympics in the eight and finished in fourth and first place, respectively.

References

1961 births
Living people
Olympic rowers of West Germany
Rowers at the 1984 Summer Olympics
Rowers at the 1988 Summer Olympics
Olympic gold medalists for West Germany
Olympic medalists in rowing
West German male rowers
Medalists at the 1988 Summer Olympics
Sportspeople from Osnabrück